Below is a list of footballers who have played at least 100 matches for ACF Fiorentina. 

In bold, players that still play for Fiorentina.

List
''Players are listed according to the date of their first-team debut for the club. Appearances and goals are for first-team official matches only. Substitute appearances included.

Key

 GK — Goalkeeper
 DF — Defender
 MF — Midfielder
 FW — Forward

Nationalities are indicated by the corresponding FIFA country code.

See also
ACF Fiorentina Hall of Fame

Footnotes

References
 

 
Fiorentina
Association football player non-biographical articles